Frozen yogurt (also known as frogurt or by the tradename Froyo) is a frozen dessert made with yogurt and sometimes other dairy and non-dairy products. Frozen yogurt is a frozen product containing the same basic ingredients as ice cream, but contains live bacterial cultures.

Usually more tart than ice cream (the tanginess in part due to the lactic acid in the yogurt), as well as lower in fat (due to the use of milk instead of cream), it is different from ice milk and conventional soft serve. Unlike yogurt, frozen yogurt is not regulated by the U.S. Food and Drug Administration (FDA), but is regulated by some U.S. states, such as California.

Production

Frozen yogurt consists of milk solids, some kind of sweetener, milk fat, yogurt culture (commonly Lactobacillus bulgaricus and Streptococcus thermophilus), plus flavorings and sometimes coloring (natural or artificial).

Milk fat comprises about 0.55–6% of the yogurt; added in quantities inversely proportional to the amount of milk solids, it lends richness to the yogurt. Milk solids account for 8–14% of the yogurt volume, providing lactose for sweetness and proteins for smoothness and increased resistance to melting. Sugar (beet or cane) provides 15–17% of the yogurt ingredients; in addition to adding sweetness, it increases the volume of solid ingredients, improving body and texture. Gelatin and/or vegetable additives (guar gum, carrageenan) stabilize the yogurt, reducing crystallization and increasing the temperature at which it will melt. This stabilization ensures that the frozen yogurt maintains a smooth consistency regardless of handling or temperature change.

Major companies often use assembly lines specifically dedicated to frozen yogurt production. Milk products and stabilizing agent(s) are combined and homogenized. At , the yogurt culture is added. The mix remains at this temperature until it sets and is ready for cooling. Once it has reached the desired temperature and viscosity, the yogurt is allowed to sit in aging tanks for up to four hours. To create extra volume and smooth consistency, the air is incorporated into the yogurt as the mixture is agitated. With a sufficient amount of air in it, the yogurt gets rapidly frozen to prevent the formation of large ice crystals and then stored in a cold place to be shipped.

Frozen yogurt can be made in a soft serve freezer much the same way as soft ice cream. Frozen yogurt mix is sold in either powder form that needs to be mixed with water or liquid form ready to pour into a soft-serve machine. A mix with high or low-fat content can be chosen, and the amount of air introduced into the soft-serve frozen yogurt is variable. The higher the fat level, the more air the yogurt can absorb; and the more air goes into the mix as it freezes, the creamier the product will taste.

Uses

Frozen yogurt is served in a large variety of flavors and styles. It also has sugar-free and fat-free alternatives. Frozen yogurt shops usually offer a multitude of toppings, from fruit to nuts, popular cookie brands, and candies. Some companies offer a more tart version considered closer to the original recipe, whereas others focus on making their own taste more like ice cream.

See also
 List of dairy products
 List of frozen yogurt companies

References

Frozen desserts
Ice cream
Yogurts